The 1979 Hamilton Tiger-Cats season was the 22nd season for the team in the Canadian Football League and their 30th overall. The Tiger-Cats finished in 3rd place in the Eastern Conference with a 6–10 record, but lost the Eastern Semi-Final to the Ottawa Rough Riders.

Star quarterback Tom Clements was acquired from the Saskatchewan Roughriders in a mid-season trade and went on to lead the league in passing. Additionally, University of Western Ontario quarterback Jamie Bone attended Tiger-Cats training camp but was cut. He took the Tiger-Cats to the Ontario Human Rights Tribunal, alleging that he was never given a fair chance to compete for a quarterback position because he was Canadian. During the proceedings, the Tiger Cats admitted that they had made up their mind on who the starters would be. Bone won his case, and the tribunal awarded him $10,000. The Tiger-Cats were awarded to give him a 14-day tryout in 1980.

Roster

Regular season

Season standings

Season schedule

Post-season

Awards and honours
 Tom Clements, All-Eastern Quarterback
 Ben Zambiasi, Linebacker, CFL's Most Outstanding Defensive Player Award
 Garney Henley was elected into the Canadian Football Hall of Fame as a Player, on June 30, 1979.
 Peter Neumann was elected into the Canadian Football Hall of Fame as a Player, June 30, 1979.

References

Hamilton Tiger-cats Season, 1979
Hamilton Tiger-Cats seasons
1979 Canadian Football League season by team